Dihydrofuran may refer to:

2,3-Dihydrofuran
2,5-Dihydrofuran